Mark John Konopacke (born April 26, 1963 in Iron Mountain, Michigan) is an American former ski jumper who competed in the Olympic Winter Games in Calgary Canada (1988) and Albertville France (1992). Konopacke holds two national titles in ski jumping (1988, Ishpemping MI; and 1991, Steamboat Springs CO—tied with Jim Holland).

References

External links

1963 births
Living people
American male ski jumpers
People from Iron Mountain, Michigan
Ski jumpers at the 1988 Winter Olympics
Universiade medalists in ski jumping
Universiade bronze medalists for the United States
Competitors at the 1981 Winter Universiade
Competitors at the 1989 Winter Universiade